Faxonius lancifer, the shrimp crayfish, is a species of crayfish in the family Cambaridae. It is widespread in the South-Eastern United States.

Description
Faxonius lancifer is a small crayfish.

Distribution and habitat
The original specimens came from Tallahatchie River at Rocky Ford, near the town of Etta, Union County, Mississippi. It is generally found in deep, slow rivers, large streams or lakes throughout its range.

References

External links

Cambaridae
Fauna of the United States
Freshwater crustaceans of North America
Crustaceans described in 1870
Taxa named by Hermann August Hagen
Taxobox binomials not recognized by IUCN